Darren Perry (born December 29, 1968) is a former professional American football player in the National Football League (NFL) and current defensive backs coach for the Vegas Vipers of the XFL. He was drafted into the NFL in 1992 by the Pittsburgh Steelers and would later go on to play professional football with the San Diego Chargers, Baltimore Ravens and New Orleans Saints. Perry retired from professional football due to a groin injury in 2000 after completing 8 years as a player. 

He went on to become an NFL defensive coach with the Cincinnati Bengals, a safeties coach with the Pittsburgh Steelers, and an assistant for the defensive backs. He was later promoted to a defensive backs coach under the Steelers' head coach and 2020 NFL Hall of Fame inductee Bill Cowher. Perry served as the safeties coach for the Oakland Raiders in 2007 and later became the safeties coach for the Green Bay Packers in 2009.

Perry is a graduate of Penn State University where he played the position of free safety from 1988 to 1991.

Playing career

High school

Perry served as a quarterback at Deep Creek High School, Chesapeake, Virginia. During his football performance at Deep Creek High, Perry passed for 24 touchdowns and 2,790 yards. Perry was able to assist the new coach, Jim Garrett, in rebuilding the team spirit. Perry also played for the basketball and tennis teams.

The Hornets were able to achieve a 4-6 season ranking, with Perry second in the Southeastern District in passing and their defensive squad ranked first in the district.

In 2007, Perry was recognized by the Deep Creek High School Alumni Association as one of the top Distinguished Notable alumni.

College
Perry was named as a first-team Football Writers All-America in 1991 and graduated as Penn State's second-leading all-time interceptor with 15 intercepts. Perry's 299 interception return yards and three interceptions for touchdowns are school records. Perry had six interceptions in his senior year and returned two for touchdowns.

Perry appeared on the cover of the November 26, 1990 issue of Sports Illustrated following Penn State’s defeat of then top-ranked Notre Dame.

Professional

An eighth-round draft pick (203rd overall) of the 1992 NFL Draft, Perry was picked by Pittsburgh Steelers head coach Bill Cowher. Perry played seven seasons (1992–98) with the Steelers and started the first 110 games of his career, including the postseason, with the team. Largely unheralded, the 5'11",  rookie picked off six passes. Perry became the first rookie since 1955 to lead the team in interceptions.

Perry was a member of the Steelers in the 1995 AFC Championship team that nearly upset the heavily favored Dallas Cowboys in Super Bowl XXX. In total, Pittsburgh won five division titles and an AFC title while appearing in three AFC championship games during Perry's time on the team.

The pairing of Perry with Pro Bowler Rod Woodson in the secondary helped create one of the NFL's most effective and durable secondaries. His 32 career interceptions from 1992-98 are tied for seventh in Pittsburgh history.

Perry signed with the San Diego Chargers in 1999 and rounded out his playing career in 2000 with the New Orleans Saints, having played in 139 of 141 possible games. He missed only two games in 1997 due to a groin injury. He started 13 postseason games, including Super Bowl XXX. He had a career total of 35 interceptions.

Perry forced four fumbles throughout his career and recovered eight more.

Perry was named the winner of the 1992 Charles Edward Greene, aka the "Joe Greene" Great Performance Award, given to the outstanding Steelers rookie. Perry is the only free safety to receive this award since it was established in 1984.

In 1997, Perry was selected as the recipient of the Pro Football Writers' "Chief Award" presented annually to the member of the Steelers’ organization who best exemplifies the spirit of cooperation with the media.

Coaching

Perry spent the 2002 season as the Cincinnati Bengals' safeties coach under his former defensive coordinator, Dick LeBeau. He was the Steelers' defensive backs coach from 2004 to 2006, after having served as assistant defensive backs coach in 2003. Perry was instrumental in the rapid development of the Steelers’ two outstanding safeties, All-Pro Troy Polamalu and Chris Hope. He resigned from the Steelers coaching staff on January 25, 2007, following the retirement of head coach Bill Cowher. Perry was hired by the Oakland Raiders as their defensive backs coach on February 5, 2007, and spent two seasons with the team.

Perry was hired by the Green Bay Packers as their safeties coach on February 3, 2009

Perry was with the Raiders before his time with the Packers, where he coached Nnamdi Asomugha to multiple Pro Bowl seasons. Prior to being with the Raiders, Perry was with the Pittsburgh Steelers staff

On January 29, 2018, Mike McCarthy announced in a press release Perry would not be returning to the Packers and would be seeking to pursue other coaching opportunities. 

Perry was officially hired by the Vegas Vipers on September 13, 2022

Personal life

In 1992, he began Intercept for Care, wherein Perry made a $500 donation to Chesapeake Care for every interception he made. Chesapeake Care is a program in which doctors, nurses, dentists and volunteers donate services to those without medical insurance in Chesapeake, Virginia. Perry later convinced others to match his contribution, making each of his interceptions worth as much as $2,500 apiece. By 1996, the program had helped over 9,000 patients. On August 27, 2022, Perry was bestowed the 2021 Presidential Volunteer Lifetime of Achievement Award for his outstanding service to the community. He was also honored by the city of Chesapeake, VA as The Chesapeake ICON 2022, Hometown Hero with a letter of recognition from the Office of the Mayor. Perry has been nominated on August 30, 2022, to the Virginia Sports Hall of Fame. 

Perry and his wife Errika have four children and live in Chesapeake, Virginia in the offseason.

In 2007, Perry, along with fellow Penn Stater and ex-Buffalo Bill Keith Goganious, helped resurrect the Hampton Roads Football Camp after a 12-year hiatus. The camp, held at Virginia Wesleyan College is aimed at high school athletes. New York Giants wide receiver Plaxico Burress was a past attendee.

References

External links
Green Bay Packers coaching bio 
Oakland Raiders coaching bio
The Virginian-Pilot, January 27, 1996
The Virginian-Pilot, January 14, 1995

1968 births
Living people
Players of American football from Virginia
Sportspeople from Chesapeake, Virginia
American football safeties
Penn State Nittany Lions football players
Pittsburgh Steelers players
San Diego Chargers players
New Orleans Saints players
Pittsburgh Steelers coaches
Oakland Raiders coaches
Green Bay Packers coaches